The Corona-Norco Unified School District (CNUSD) is a school district in Riverside County, California, in the United States, serving the cities of Corona, Norco, Eastvale and Jurupa Valley, along with the CDPs of Coronita, El Cerrito, Home Gardens, Lake Mathews and Temescal Valley. It is the largest public school district in Riverside County (5th largest in SoCal after LA Unified, San Diego Unified, Long Beach Unified, and San Bernardino City Unified)  and was named the California Exemplary School District of 2019. CNUSD has 50 schools in operation: 30 elementary schools, 3 K-8 academies, 8 intermediate schools, 1 Hybrid school, and 8 high schools. The school board is composed of five members, elected by geographical district and serve a four-year term with the elections being held in November of even-numbered years.

High schools
 Santiago High School
 Centennial High School
 Corona High School
 Eleanor Roosevelt High School
 John F. Kennedy Middle College High School
 Lee Pollard High School
 Norco High School
 Orange Grove High School
 Hybrid School of Innovation/Online Learning

Intermediate schools

 Auburndale Intermediate School
 Citrus Hills Intermediate School
 Corona Fundamental Intermediate School
 El Cerrito Middle School
 Norco Intermediate School
 Raney Intermediate School
 River Heights Intermediate School
 Dr. Augustine Ramirez Intermediate School
 Chavez K-8 Academy
 Home Gardens K-8 Academy
 Todd K-8 Academy

Elementary schools

 Adams Elementary School
 Susan B. Anthony Elementary School
 Clara Barton Elementary School
 Corona Ranch Elementary School
 Coronita Elementary School
 Eastvale Elementary School
 Eisenhower Elementary School
 Foothill Elementary School
 Franklin Elementary School
 Garretson Elementary School
 Harada Elementary School
 Highland Elementary School
 Jefferson Elementary School
 Lincoln Fundamental School
 McKinley Elementary School
 Norco Elementary School
 Orange Elementary School
 Parkridge School for the Arts
 Parks Elementary School
 Prado View Elementary School
 Rondo School Of Discovery
 Riverview Elementary School
 Ronald Reagan Elementary School
 Sierra Vista Elementary School
 Stallings Elementary School
 Temescal Valley Elementary School
 VanderMolen Elementary School
 Vicentia Elementary School
 Victress Bower School School
 Washington Elementary School
 Wilson Elementary School

References

External links
 

School districts in Riverside County, California
Education in Corona, California
Norco, California